Union Sportive des Forces Armées is a Burkinabé football club based in Ouagadougou. They play their home games at the Stade de l'USFA. The club's colors are blue and red.

Achievements
Burkinabé Premier League: 7
 1969, 1970, 1971, 1984 (as ASFAN)
 1987, 1998, 2000.

Coupe du Faso: 4
 1968 (as ASFAN)
 2002, 2010, 2015.

Burkinabé Leaders Cup: 1
 1996.

Burkinabé SuperCup: 3
 1997–98, 1999–00, 2009–10.

Performance in CAF competitions
CAF Champions League: 2 appearances
1999 – First Round
2001 – First Round

 African Cup of Champions Clubs: 1 appearance
1985 – withdrew in Preliminary Round

CAF Confederation Cup: 2 appearances
2010 – Preliminary Round
2011 – First Round of 16

CAF Cup: 3 appearances
1995 – First Round
1997 – Second Round
2000 – First Round

References

 
Football clubs in Burkina Faso
Association football clubs established in 1962
Sport in Ouagadougou
1962 establishments in Upper Volta
Military association football clubs